Xiyu or Hsi-yü can refer to:

Xiyu, Penghu, an island and township in Taiwan
Western Regions, Xīyù in Chinese, a historical name for parts of Central Asia